Shepley Hill is a summit in the U.S. state of Massachusetts.

The hill was named as early as the 1670s after the local Shepley family.

References

Mountains of Middlesex County, Massachusetts
Mountains of Massachusetts